The 2010 Alabama gubernatorial election took place on November 2, 2010. Incumbent Republican Governor Bob Riley was term-limited and unable to seek re-election. The party primaries were held on June 1, 2010, with a Republican runoff on July 13. In the general election, Republican Robert J. Bentley defeated Democrat Ron Sparks. This was the first election in which Republicans won three consecutive gubernatorial elections in the state.

Republican primary

Candidates
Robert J. Bentley, state representative
Bradley Byrne, former state two-year college chancellor, former state senator and former member of the Alabama State Board of Education
Tim James, businessman, son of former Governor Fob James and candidate for governor in 2002
 Bill Johnson, former director of the Alabama Department of Economic and Community Affairs and former Birmingham City Councilman
Roy Moore, former Chief Justice of the Alabama Supreme Court and candidate for governor in 2006
James Potts, perennial candidate
Charles Taylor, perennial candidate

Endorsements

Polling

Results

Democratic primary

Candidates
Ron Sparks, Alabama Commissioner of Agriculture and Industries
Artur Davis, U.S. Representative

Polling

Results

General election

Predictions

Polling

Results

See also
 List of governors of Alabama

References

External links
Alabama Secretary of State – Elections
Alabama Governor Candidates at Project Vote Smart
Alabama Governor 2010 from OurCampaigns.com
Campaign contributions for 2010 Alabama Governor from Follow the Money
2010 Alabama Gubernatorial General Election graph of multiple polls from Pollster.com
Election 2010: Alabama Governor from Rasmussen Reports
2010 Alabama Governor Race from Real Clear Politics
2010 Alabama Governor's Race from CQ Politics
Race Profile in The New York Times
Debates
Alabama Gubernatorial Debate, C-SPAN, September 16, 2010
Official campaign websites
 Robert J. Bentley for Governor
Ron Sparks for Governor

Gubernatorial
2010
Alabama